Raymond Frederick Bailey (25 November 1935 – 15 February 2012) was a member of the Tasmanian Legislative Council. He was first elected to the now abolished Division of Cornwall on 26 May 1990. He was re-elected in the 1996 Cornwall election.

Bailey became President of the Legislative Council on 17 June 1997, a position which he held until 4 May 2002.

In 1999 a redistribution tribunal abolished his electorate of Cornwall, because of the reduction in the size of parliament. Instead he automatically became member for Rosevears; this new electorate included much of Cornwall anyway. He retired in 2002, and died in 2012.

References

External links

Members of the Tasmanian Legislative Council
1935 births
2012 deaths
Independent members of the Parliament of Tasmania
Presidents of the Tasmanian Legislative Council
20th-century Australian politicians
21st-century Australian politicians